Hilmar "Himpa" O. Wictorin (25 February 1894 – 11 April 1964) was a Swedish water polo player who competed in the 1924 Summer Olympics. In 1924 he was part of the Swedish team which finished fourth. He played one match.

References

1894 births
1964 deaths
Swedish male water polo players
Olympic water polo players of Sweden
Water polo players at the 1924 Summer Olympics